Ardesaldo is one of 28 parishes (administrative divisions) in Salas, a municipality within the province and autonomous community of Asturias, in northern Spain.

Villages
Ardesaldo 
Balloria (Vallouria)
La Borra 
La Peña
Peñallonga 
Las Barracas 
Villarmor

References

Parishes in Salas